Epsilon Ursae Minoris (ε Ursae Minoris) is a binary star system in the northern circumpolar constellation of Ursa Minor. It is visible to the naked eye with a combined apparent visual magnitude of 4.19. Based upon an annual parallax shift of 10.73 mas as seen from the Earth, it is located around 300 light years from the Sun. The pair are drawing nearer to the Sun with a radial velocity of −10.57 km/s.

This system forms a detached, single-lined spectroscopic binary with an orbital period of 39.5 days and a low eccentricity of 0.04. Its binary nature was discovered in 1899 by American astronomer W. W. Campbell and the first orbital determination was made in 1910 by Canadian astronomer J. S. Plaskett. The orbital plane is nearly aligned with the line of sight to the Earth, so the pair forms an eclipsing binary. The primary eclipse has a minimum of 4.23 in magnitude, while the secondary minimum is magnitude 4.21. This eclipsing behavior was discovered by German astronomer P. Guthnick using observations between 1946 and 1947.

The primary is an evolved G-type giant star with a stellar classification of G5 III. The secondary is a main sequence star with a class in the range A8-F0 V. One of the pair is an active RS Canum Venaticorum type variable star, which is causing the net brightness to vary with a period that matches the orbital period of the binary. The primary has a high projected rotational velocity of 25.6 km/s, which is likely the result of synchronization effects from tidal interaction with the secondary.

Epsilon Ursae Minoris has a visual companion: a magnitude 12.32 star at an angular separation of 77.0 arc seconds along a position angle of 2°, as of 2014.

References

External links

G-type giants
Eclipsing binaries
Spectroscopic binaries
RS Canum Venaticorum variables
Ursae Minoris, Epsilon
Ursa Minor (constellation)
Durchmusterung objects
Ursae Minoris, 22
153751
082080
6322